The 2019 Macau Grand Prix (formally the 66th Suncity Group Macau Grand Prix – FIA F3 World Cup) was a motor race for Formula Three cars held on the streets of Macau on 17 November 2019. Unlike past races, the 2019 Macau Grand Prix was held as a non-championship round of the FIA Formula 3 Championship, and was open to drivers from all Formula Three championships. The race itself was made up of two races: a ten-lap qualifying race that decided the starting grid for the fifteen-lap main event. The 2019 race was the 66th running of the Macau Grand Prix, the 37th for Formula Three cars and the fourth edition of the FIA F3 World Cup.

The Grand Prix was won by MP Motorsport driver Richard Verschoor from fourth position. Jüri Vips of the Hitech Grand Prix team won the qualification race the day before and led the first seven laps of the main race before Verschoor passed him for first place on the eighth lap. Verschoor blocked Vips' multiple attempts to overtake him to become the first rookie to win the Macau Grand Prix since Keisuke Kunimoto in 2008. He was the first ever Dutch driver to win the event and the second overall after Roberto Moreno to win the New Zealand Grand Prix and Macau. Vips finished second and Logan Sargeant of the Carlin Buzz Racing team was third.

Background and entry list
The Macau Grand Prix is a Formula Three race considered by drivers as a stepping stone to higher motor racing categories such as Formula One, and is Macau's most prestigious international sporting event. The event was made a non-championship round of the FIA Formula 3 Championship for the first time in 2019; its head Bruno Michel ensured the season concluded at the Sochi Autodrom and not the Yas Marina Circuit as it had been in the preceding GP3 Series to prevent logistical complications for drivers and teams. It was the 66th iteration of the race, the 37th time it was held to Formula Three regulations, and the 4th edition of the FIA F3 World Cup. It was held on the temporary  22-turn Guia Circuit in the streets of Macau on 17 November 2019 after three days of practice and qualifying.

In order to compete in Macau, drivers in possession of a FIA Grade B license or higher and who raced in the FIA Formula 3 Championship or its regional championships were invited to race by motorsport's world governing body, the Fédération Internationale de l'Automobile (FIA), with higher-placed driver in these respective series receiving priority in earning an invitation to the meeting. The race's 30-car grid featured 2019 FIA Formula 3 champion Robert Shwartzman, two-time Macau Grand Prix winner Dan Ticktum, Deutsche Tourenwagen Masters driver Ferdinand Habsburg, FIA Formula Two competitor Callum Ilott, European Le Mans Series participant Arjun Maini, Japanese Formula 3 Championship racer Enaam Ahmed, and Enzo Fittipaldi and Sophia Flörsch from the Formula Regional European Championship. Frederik Vesti, the Formula Regional European champion, was employed by the Prema team to drive the injured Jehan Daruvala's car; Alex Peroni was required to withdraw from the race due to a broken vertebrae he sustained in an accident at the Autodromo Nazionale di Monza.

The replacement of the series' outdated Dallara F317 car with the more powerful Dallara F3 2019 prompted organisers to make minor upgrades to the Guia Circuit from an FIA Grade 3 homologation to a Grade 2. Former FIA race director Charlie Whiting and circuit organisers had expressed their desire for such as change in May 2019. They moved the inside wall at Lisboa turn in order to direct vehicles away from its apex kerb and towards a widened run-off area, in response to a major accident involving Flörsch, Daruvala and Sho Tsuboi in the 2018 race. The corner's fencing was supported by a second row of fences on the Hotel Lisboa grounds, a tyre wall was installed, and a photographer's area that had halted Flörsch's car was dismantled. The Reservoir and Mandarin Bend corners were realigned and retrofitted with SAFER barriers. TecPro energy-absorbing walls were installed at the San Francisco, Hospital and Fisherman's Bend turns and foam-protection technologies were implemeneted at several places on the track.

Pirelli became the event's tyre supplier for the second time after 2016. Cars were installed with drag reduction system (DRS), an adjustable flap at the back of each car that helps with overtaking when activated, at Macau for the first time. It had one activation zone for the race: on the straight between the Mandarin Oriental Bend and Lisboa corners. Per the regulations of the FIA Formula 3 Championships, cars had to be within a second of the other to use the system. An electronic flag system was implemented and elevated for the first time in ten areas of the circuit to complement the existing flags waved by track marshals. The sections were determined by the FIA, the Macau Grand Prix Committee and multiple governmental departments of Macau with an objective of expanding its deployment in the future. The Government of Macau's Civil Aviation Authority barred all unmanned aircraft from flying during the race weekend to improve safety and prevent hindrances.

Practice and qualifying
A total of two 40-minute practice sessions preceded the Sunday race: one on Thursday mid-morning and one on late Friday morning. In the first session, which occurred in clear and warm weather, Marcus Armstrong was fastest, setting a new unofficial overall track lap record of 2 minutes, 8.023 seconds with two minutes to go, followed by Jake Hughes, Ticktum, Shwartzman, Richard Verschoor, Ilott, Vesti, Ahmed, Logan Sargeant and Christian Lundgaard in positions two through ten. Yuki Tsunoda braked too late and struck a barrier at the Hospital Bend with 16 minutes to go and activating the virtual safety car procedure to order drivers to slow. The Hitech Grand Prix team repaired his car; he was unable to participate for most of the first qualifying session because of ongoing car work. Jüri Vips had a DRS failure late in the session that caused a slot in his rear wing to lodge open; he entered the pit lane to have it fixed.

Qualifying was divided into two 40-minute sessions held on Thursday afternoon and Friday afternoon respectively. The fastest time set by each driver from either session counted towards their final starting position for the qualification race. The first qualifying session was held in clear and warm weather. Armstrong set a benchmark fastest lap before Shwartzman and then Vips led. Hughes revised the overall fastest lap to 2 minutes, 6.793 seconds for provisional pole position. David Beckmann was 0.051 seconds slower in second. Vips was third, early pace setter Armstrong fourth, and Sargeant fifth. Ticktum, in his first race driving the new Formula 3 car, came sixth ahead of Ilott, Vesti, Shwartzman and Lundaard. Following them were the Italian duo of Leonardo Pulcini and Alessio Lorandi in 11th and 12th, and Felipe Drugovich, Verschoor, Maini, Sebastián Fernández, Ahmed, Liam Lawson, Habsburg, Keyvan Andres, Hon Chio Leong, David Schumacher, Flörsch, Fittipaldi, Andreas Estner, Lukas Dunner, Olli Caldwell, Alessio Deledda and Max Fewtrell. The five fastest drivers were separated by 0.619 seconds and, due to the faster Dallara cars, lap times overall lowered by an average of 3½ seconds. There were four red flag stoppages during the session. Ahmed stopped after hitting a barrier at Lisboa corner, with fluids from his car leaking onto the track en route to the pit lane. Fewtrell then hit the outside barrier at Lisboa turn, and Caldwell stopped on the track after exiting Fisherman's Bend due to engine failure. An accident for Tsunoda against a barrier at Maternity Bend caused the race director to end the session early.

In the second practice session, Shwartzman led early on until Ticktum went faster. Vips then improved to 2 minutes, 6.569 seconds to reset the unofficial circuit record, with more than five minutes remaining. Ilott was 0.568 seconds slower in second. Verschoor, Armstrong, Lawson, Ticktum, Maini, Shwartzman, Caldwell and Sargeant were third to tenth. The session had to be stopped twice due to separate incidents. An understeer caused Flörsch to stop against the barrier after the Melco hairpin. She blocked the track because she stalled her car while reversing. As a crane extricated Flörsch's car, Habsburg spun and stopped the session. Beckmann made a braking error for Police corner and crashed with five minutes to go. Ticktum was caught off guard and hit the rear of Beckmann's car at high speed, ending the session early. The stewards investigated Ticktum and imposed no penalty; they deemed him to have made "a significant attempt" to avoid Beckmann and a lack of time to notice double waved yellow flags to alert drivers to Ticktum's crash.

The second qualifying session was held in warmer weather than the first. It was first halted after ten minutes when Pulcini crashed; Fittipaldi was caught off guard by Pulcini's accident and hit the rear of his car. 20 minutes in Armstrong became the first driver to go below 2 minutes and 6 seconds mark, before he crashed into an outside wall at Police turn and removed his front wing and right front tyre to stop qualifying again with 19 minutes left. Vips reset the official track lap record to a 2 minutes, 4.997 seconds—five seconds faster than the 2018 lap record—in the final seven minutes. The session ended with two minutes to go after a third stoppage, when Habsburg crashed and stopped on the circuit. Vips earned the pole position for the qualifying race. Shwartzman was 0.379 seconds slower in second place. Ilott, Lundgaard and Verschoor moved to third, fourth and fifth. Hughes fell from first to sixth, with Vesti and Maini seventh and eighth. Armstrong's crash put him ninth, Sargeant tenth, Habsburg eleventh and Fewtrell twelfth. Carlin mechanics rebuilt Ticktum's car; he had 20 minutes on the track and took 13th. Behind him the rest of the provisional grid lined up as Lorandi, Lawson, Drugovich, Caldwell, Fernández, Beckmann, Ahmed, Tsunoda, Andres, Schumacher, Dunner, Pulcini, Estner, Flörsch, Leong, Deledda and Fittipaldi.

Post-qualifying
After qualifying, the stewards imposed a three-place grid penalty on Tsunoda because they deemed him to have reversed in "an unexpected manner" to rejoin the circuit after he ventured onto the Lisboa corner run-off area.

Qualifying classification
Each of the driver's fastest lap times from the two qualifying sessions are denoted in bold.

  – Yuki Tsunoda had a three-place grid penalty because he was deemed to have reversed in  "an unexpected manner" to rejoin the track.

Qualification race

The 10-lap qualifying race to set the starting order for the main race commenced at 09:00 Macau Standard Time (UTC+08:00) on Saturday, 16 November. Vips kept the lead from Shwartzman heading into Lisboa turn after a slow start. Lundgaard overtook Ilott for third and clung onto Shwartzman's slipstream. Shwartzman held second from Lundgaard. Further back, Sargeant braked later than other drivers and his front wing glanced Maini's rear-right wheel. Maini was sent into a spin and rested against a trackside wall in a way that caused his vehicle to protrude at the exit of Lisboa turn. Ticktum attempted to pass Hughes as he negotiated his way past Maini's car and he and Hughes made contact. Ticktum was sent airborne and made a pit stop for repairs. Hughes and Ahmed were caught up in the crash as Sargeant continued driving. Officials dispatched the safety car to allow track marshals to clear debris. Armstrong and Vesti lost several positions, promoting Lorandi and Schumacher to the top ten; the latter made a pit stop for unknown reasons and fell down the order.

The safety car was withdrawn on the fourth lap and Vips maintained the lead from Shwartzman at the rolling restart. Vips began to pull away from the remainder of the field to such an extent he was able to prevent Shwartzman from using DRS to overtake him. DRS was deployed by a number of drivers until it was disabled because of a sensor fault that restricted its usage. Soon after, after Verschoor caught Ilott and used the slipstream from the back of the latter's vehicle to pass him for fourth position on the straight linking the Mandarin Oriental Bend and Lisboa corners on the eighth lap. On the same lap, Drugovich in 15th made a braking error for Lisboa turn and had an accident that caused him to retire. He exited his car unaided and swift work by track marshals to extricate his car before the field passed by eliminated the need for a second safety car deployment. Vips finished the qualification race first to earn pole position for the Grand Prix. Shwartzman was second and Lundgaard third. The final classified finishers were Verschoor, Ilott, Sargeant, Lorandi, Habsburg, Beckmann, Pulcini, Andres, Dunner, Leong, Fittipaldi, Fernández, Tsunoda, Armstrong, Vesti, Estner, Lawson, Flörsch, Fewtrell, Caldwell, Deledda and Schumacher.

Qualification race classification

  – Dan Ticktum was running at the completion of the race and was not classified because he failed to complete 90 per cent of the total race distance.

Main race

The 15-lap race began at 15:30 local time on 17 November. The weather was dry and clear with the air temperature . Vips maintained the lead intoo MandarinOriental Bend. Shwartzman in second position had a slow start and Lundgaard on the right drew alongside him; Verschoor steered right to go three-abreast as he slipstreamed past Lundgaard and Shwartzman for second. Room on the track lessened and Shwartzman and Lundgaard made contact. Shwartzman's front-right wing end-plate hit Lundgaard's rear-left wheel and the latter drove over the appendage to fracture it and puncture Shwartzman's front-right tyre. Shwartzman slowed and stopped on Lisboa corner's run-off area to retire. Ilott made a slow getaway and fell to eighth. By the conclusion of lap one Lawson had moved from 20th to 13th as Armstrong had overtaken Vesti for 16th, and Vips led Verschoor by 1.8 seconds.

On the fourth lap, Caldwell retired due to the consequences of an earlier collision that damaged his front wing and a tyre. Pulcini duelled for seventh when he struck a tyre barrier at Lisboa corner and retired. Shortly thereafter, the safety car deployed due to an accident that nullified Vips' lead over Verschoor: Habsburg entered the Solitude Esses too quickly, ricocheted off a right-hand-side kerb and struck the wall. Habsburg exited his car unhurt and unaided as both his and Pulicini's cars were extricated from the circuit. At the restart on lap eight, which saw the field return to racing speed, Verschoor prepared to pass Vips as the latter weaved on the track to try and prevent the former from slipstreaming him. Verschoor had a strong side slipstream, more speed and grip, and turned left and braked later than Vips to take the lead before Lisboa corner. Sargeant overtook Lorandi for fourth and an understeer lost Andres eighth to Lawson. On lap nine Sargeant passed Lundgaard at Lisboa corner for third.

Flörsch stopped on the straight towards Mandarin Oriental Bend with an electrical problem on lap nine, prompting the brief activation of the virtual safety car procedure to temporarily stop racing and allow for the recovery of Flörsch's car. When the virtual safety car procedure was lifted, Vips drove on debris and wore his tyres, reducing their grip. He drew close to Verschoor after the latter made an error at Police Bend but could not pass him due to the narrow track. Vips subsequently tried to pass Verschoor into Lisboa turn on lap eleven; the latter swerved to prevent hitting a trackside wall as he braked as late as possible, retaining the lead. On the following lap Vips used DRS to again try to pass Verschoor on the entry to Lisboa corner, but was unsuccessful as Verschoor turned left as late as he could. Verschoor caused Vips to run close to the turn's run-off area after Vips flat-spotted his tyres, affecting his car's handling.

Vips was still able to close up to Verschoor, who adapted to a bent steering arm, causing him to fight for control of his car. Both Verschoor and Vips made errors on the 14th lap; Verschoor locked his tyres and Vips oversteered at Fisherman's Bend. Vips again used DRS and Verschoor defended the lead. On his first appearance in Macau, it was Verschoor's victory, achieving the first win for a rookie driver in Macau since Keisuke Kunimoto in 2008. He was the first Dutch driver to win the race, and the second to win the Macau and New Zealand Grands Prix after Roberto Moreno in 1982. Vips finished second to exceed Ralf Aron as the highest-placed Estonian finisher in Macau, and Sargeant third. Off the podium, Lundgaard was fourth after Sargeant held him off. Lorandi was fifth in his first race after recovering from a thumb injury. Ilott took sixth ahead of Lawson, who gained 13 places after starting 20th. Armstrong, Beckmann, Vesti, Tsunoda, Andres, Ticktum, Dunner, Fernández, Fittipaldi, Hughes, Fewtrell, Leong, Estner, Schumacher, Ahmed, Maini, Drugovich and Deledda were the final finishers.

Post-race
The top three drivers appeared on the podium to collect their trophies and spoke to the media in a later press conference. Verschoor said he was delighted to win and expressed a wish to return to Macau in 2020: "To be honest, I am not believing the feeling yet! It hasn't sunk in that I have just won the Macau Grand Prix! It was a really busy race and I was under a lot of pressure. I had to concentrate so much towards the end, and I am still recovering a bit. Both the team and myself are maybe not as experienced yet or consistently at the same level as some of the other guys, so this is a huge result for the team, myself and everyone involved." Vips said he was disappointed not to win and attributed it to a DRS failure on his car and tyre wear: "I’m just feeling disappointed because I think I did the perfect weekend minus the safety car restart. The DRS was supposed to work but it didn’t. I don’t know how I managed to keep Richard under pressure in the middle sector because my tyres were finished."

Sargeant thanked his team Carlin for the work they put in for the race: "They have done an absolutely brilliant job this weekend. I think we have come here with full force and full preparation. It's been a difficult year and that’s why I want to really thank Carlin, because we’ve really brought something extra here and we have worked hard for it.” Shwartzman declared himself to have had a "very sad" premature conclusion to his race: "All weekend we had really good pace and were fighting for the win. Macau is like a gambling game, you never know what is going to happen. Anyways, we did all we could this week, thank you Prema – the car was on the top [level]." Ilott said he had not driven the Dallara car before the Macau race or undertaken any simulator running due to air flight cancellations. He spoke of the car on the race, "We changed a lot on the car after the qualification race and it did work out. But I lost a bit of time from the virtual safety car and trying to work back from that was quite difficult."

Race classification

See also
 2019 FIA GT World Cup
 2019 Guia Race of Macau

References

External links
 

Macau Grand Prix
Macau Grand Prix Formula Three
Macau Grand Prix
Macau Grand Prix Formula Three
Macau Grand Prix Formula Three